Henry Paul William Lyster Jameson (1875, Louth – 26 February 1922, West Mersea) was a zoologist, who studied pearl-formation. He also made contributions to speleology and encouraged the study of psychology in adult education.

Life
H. Lyster Jameson was born in Louth the son of Paul Lyster Jameson, the rector of Killincoole. He was educated at Trinity College Dublin. In 1895 he explored the Marble Arch Caves with Édouard-Alfred Martel, and was the first to describe fauna in the Mitchelstown Cave.

Put in charge of a pearling station in British New Guinea, he studied the causes of pearl-formation. He continued this research at the Lancashire Sea Fisheries Station in Piel Island, Barrow-in-Furness,  developing the parasitic theory of pearl-formation in the common sea mussel.

After developing pulmonary tuberculosis, he went to South Africa in 1902. Here he married Millicent Lucy Parker at Krugersdorp. He worked for the Natal Education Department and later was professor of Biology the Transvaal Technical Institute in Johannesburg. However when the Institute – renamed the Transvaal University College – was reorganised in 1908, Jameson's post was abolished and he returned to England.

Back in England from 1914 he was employed as a civil servant for Board of Agriculture and Fisheries. He quickly set up the Fisheries Experimental Station at West Mersea.

Outline of Psychology
Jameson became a Marxist and joined the Plebs' League, with whom he made "strenuous attempts [...] to develop psychology" as a component of working-class education in the League. He used the pen-name "Nordicus". He wrote the first draft of An Outline of Psychology, an introductory psychology textbook published by them. The final text was produced in an attempt at "communal production"

This version went through eight editions before Eden and Cedar Paul, with Edward Conze produced a revised edition in 1938, by which time 18,000 copies had been produced.

He died of tuberculosis in 1922.

Works
 Contributions to the anatomy and histology of Thalassema neptunii Gaertner, 1899. Jena : G. Fischer, 1899.
 On the origin of pearls, 1902
 Studies on pearl-oysters and pearls. Pt. 1. Structure of the shell and pearls of the Ceylon pearl-oyster (Margaritifera vulgaris Schumacher); with an examination of the cestode theory of pearl-production, 1912
 
 Outline of psychology, Plebs' League, 1922. 6th ed., 1933, revised and expanded by Eden and Cedar Paul.

References

Further reading
 

1874 births
1922 deaths
Irish zoologists
Alumni of Trinity College Dublin
Heidelberg University alumni
British speleologists